Danilo Vitalino Pereira (born 20 June 1986), known as Danilo, is a Brazilian professional footballer who plays as a forward.

Honours
Linense

 Campeonato Paulista Série A2: 2010

Rio Branco

 Campeonato Acreano: 2011

References

External links

1986 births
Living people
Brazilian footballers
Association football forwards
J2 League players
FC Gifu players

Brazilian expatriate footballers
Expatriate footballers in Japan
Brazilian expatriate sportspeople in Japan